Paraona interjecta is a moth of the  family Erebidae. It was described by Strand in 1912. It is found in Lesotho, South Africa and Zimbabwe.

References

Lithosiina
Moths described in 1912